The Temporary Emergency Court of Appeals was established by the United States Congress in December 1971 with exclusive jurisdiction to hear appeals from the decisions of the U.S. district courts in cases arising under the wage and price control program of the Economic Stabilization Act of 1970.

Congress authorized the Chief Justice of the United States to appoint to the temporary court three or more district and appeals court judges, each of whom was to serve on a part-time basis for an indefinite term. The court exercised the same powers as a U.S. court of appeals, and it was authorized to prescribe its own rules of practice, which it did when its three district and six circuit court judges convened for the first time in February 1972. The Temporary Emergency Court of Appeals was modeled on the Emergency Court of Appeals, which was established in 1942 to hear appeals in cases involving various wartime price control measures and which heard its last case in 1961.

It was created by the Act of December 22, 1971. Although the Economic Stabilization Act expired in 1974, Congress extended the operation of the Temporary Emergency Court of Appeals in the Emergency Petroleum Allocation Act of 1973. The court exercised the judicial review provisions of the energy price stabilization program established by the act. The temporary court’s jurisdiction was further expanded in the Energy Policy and Conservation Act of 1975 and the Emergency Natural Gas Act of 1977 (91 Stat. 4). The Act of October 29, 1992 abolished the Temporary Emergency Court of Appeals and transferred both its jurisdiction and its pending cases to the U.S. Court of Appeals for the Federal Circuit effective March 29, 1993.

List of judges
The following judges were members of the Temporary Emergency Court of Appeals:

References

External links
 History from the Federal Judicial Center

Defunct United States courts
United States courts of appeals
1971 establishments in the United States
1993 disestablishments in the United States
Courts and tribunals established in 1971
Courts and tribunals disestablished in 1993